SFC Kalinkovo is a Slovak football team, based in the town of Kalinkovo.

Current squad

Colours
Club colours are blue and yellow.

External links
Official club website 
Ligy.sk profile 
  
Club profile at Futbalnet.sk 
Club profile at Soccerway

References

Football clubs in Slovakia
Association football clubs established in 1970
1970s establishments in Slovakia